Guy Hervé Mahop (born April 26, 1984) is a Cameroonian footballer that currently plays for PSCS Cilacap in the Liga Indonesia Premier Division (LPIS). He previously played for Fourway Athletics at the Hong Kong First Division League.

References

1984 births
Association football defenders
Cameroonian expatriate footballers
Cameroonian expatriate sportspeople in Hong Kong
Cameroonian expatriate sportspeople in Indonesia
Cameroonian footballers
Expatriate footballers in Hong Kong
Expatriate footballers in Indonesia
Fourway Athletics players
Hong Kong First Division League players
Indonesian Premier Division players
Living people
PSCS Cilacap players